George Barret may refer to:

 George Barret Sr. ( 1730–1784) Irish landscape painter
 George Barret Jr. (1767–1842), English landscape painter, son of George Barret, Sr.
 George Barrett (actuary) (born 1752), English actuary
 George Barrett (jockey) (born 1863), English jockey

See also
George Barrett (disambiguation)